Andrew Carpenter may refer to:

 Andrew Carpenter (One Life to Live), One Life to Live character
 Andrew Carpenter (baseball) (born 1985), American baseball pitcher
Andy Carpenter, character in books by David Rosenfelt
Andy Carpenter, anglicisation of Andries Carpentière (1672–1737), Dutch or French sculptor active in Britain

See also
Andrew Carpenter House, in Gaston County, North Carolina